Stephen Troyte Dunn (26 August 1868, Bristol - 18 April, 1938, Sheen, Surrey, England) was a British botanist. He described and systematized a significant number of plants around the world, his input most noticeable in the taxonomy of the flora of China. Among the plants he first scientifically described was Bauhinia blakeana, the national flower of Hong Kong.

Biography 
Born in Bristol in the family of Rev. James Dunn, of Northern Irish descent, S. T. Dunn was educated at Radley, and at Merton College, Oxford, where he earned his BA in classics.

He was private secretary to liberal politician Thomas Acland in 1897, and the next year (as in 1898 Thomas Acland died) he first joined Kew as private secretary to the director, W. T. Thiselton-Dyer. He was then assistant for India in the herbarium from 1901 until his departure for Hong Kong in 1903. At Kew prior to this, he worked on compiling the second supplement of Index Kewensis that was issued in 1904-1905.

While superintendent at the Department of Botany and Forestry, Hong Kong (1903-1910), Stephen Dunn would go on expeditions and make many collections in Asia, including Taiwan, Guangdong province and Fujian Province, as well as in Korea and Japan. He was especially interested in ferns.

After returning to England, he became an official guide at Kew in 1913, but left Britain again in 1915 for America. Returning four years later, he went back to the Kew herbarium, where he remained until his retirement in 1928.

Among his published works were many articles on the Chinese flora as well as flora of Britain. He was a regular contributor to Journal of the Linnean Society.

Legacy 
 (not to be confused with Dunn in zoology, where it refers to herpetologist Emmett Reid Dunn)

Colleague William James Tutcher named Amorphophallus dunnii after him.

Family 

He married firstly Maud, youngest daughter of Rev. W. H. Thornton, rector of North Bovey, Devon on the 17th of April 1901 in St. Barnabas' Church, Pimlico, London. She took keen interest in botany as well. Maudiae was the word used by S. T. Dunn in her honor when naming magnolia Michelia maudiae Dunn.
He married secondly Eila Foster, daughter of Henry Oldham Foster & His wife Johanna Christina Hermina née Keuchenius in 1901 at London, England.

Works 

 Stephen Troyte Dunn, William James Tutcher. Flora of Kwangtung and Hong Kong (China) being an account of the flowering plants, ferns and fern allies together with keys for their determination preceded by a map and introduction. London: H. M. Stationery off., printed by Darling and son, ltd., 1912. PDF
 Stephen Troyte Dunn. A supplementary list of Chinese flowering plants, 1904-1910. London, 1911. PDF
 Stephen Troyte Dunn. Alien flora of Britain. West, Newman, and Co., 1905
 Stephen Troyte Dunn. Descriptions of New Chinese Plants. 1904.
 C.H. Wright, Charles Geekie Matthew, Stephen Troyte Dunn. Flora of the Falkland Islands. London: Linnean Society, 1911.
 James Sykes Gamble, Stephen Troyte Dunn, Cecil Ernest Claude Fischer. Flora of the Presidency of Madras. Botanical Survey of India, 1967.
 Stephen Troyte Dunn. A Key to the Labiatae of China. London: Her Majesty's Stationery Office, 1915.
 Chapter "Flora" in Twentieth Century Impressions of Hong Kong, Shanghai, and other Treaty Ports of China. Their History, People, Commerce, Industries, and Resources. Lloyd's (London), 1908.
, Page 325 (re Bauhinia × blakeana)

Further reading 

 C.E.C. Fischer. 1938, Kew Bulletin of Miscellaneous Information, 1938(5): 214-215.
 Journal of Botany, 1938, pp. 183–184.
 Geoffrey Alton Craig Herklots. Hong Kong Countryside, Hong Kong: South China Morning Post, 1951, pp. 167–168.
 Brummitt, R.K. & Powell, C.E., Authors of Plant Names (1992): 178;
 Kent, D.H. & Allen, D.E., Brit. Irish Herb. (1984): 133;
 Lanjouw, J. & Stafleu, F.A., Index Herb. Coll. A-D (1954): 171;

References

English explorers
Fellows of the Linnean Society of London
Fellows of the Royal Geographical Society
Botanists active in China
Hong Kong scientists
Botanists active in Kew Gardens
20th-century British botanists
Scientists from Bristol
Alumni of Merton College, Oxford
People educated at Radley College
1868 births
1938 deaths